Albert Arthur Ringrose (8 November 1916 – 1968) was an English professional footballer who played for Tottenham Juniors, Northfleet United, Tottenham Hotspur and Notts County.

Football career
Ringrose began his career at Tottenham Juniors. He joined Tottenham Hotspur in 1934 before joining the club's "nursery" team Northfleet United.
The full back rejoined the Spurs in 1936 and made 10 appearances for the club. Ringrose transferred to Notts County in May, 1939  where he featured in one match.

References

1916 births
1968 deaths
People from Edmonton, London
English footballers
English Football League players
Northfleet United F.C. players
Tottenham Hotspur F.C. players
Notts County F.C. players
Association football defenders
Association football fullbacks